Pseudocardinals, quasi-cardinals or anticardinals were the uncanonical Cardinals created by six of the Antipopes, in or rival to Rome, including two of Avignon Papacy and one of Pisa, as princes of their schismatic government of the Catholic Church.

Status 
Their state, like the state of the antipopes and the anti-bishops these appointed/created, is disputed. Many pseudocardinals were created during the controversy between the Holy See and the Holy Roman Empire during the Western Schism, and some of the cardinals switched their obedience. The legitimacy of the Popes of the different obediences during the Western Schism was not a clear matter for their contemporaries. The terms antipope, pseudocardinal and anticardinal were not used at that time, but they are now used by some modern Roman Catholic historians.

Creations by Antipopes 
The following Antipopes created pseudo-cardinals (with status and age at time of creation in parenthesis when available) :

In Rome 
 Antipope Anacletus II (1130–1138) - 3 consistories, 8 pseudocardinals
 Consistory of 1130.03.29 (3)
 Mr. Germano, Cardinal-Deacon
 Mr. Gregorio Otone, Cardinal-Deacon
 Father Pietro, O.S.B. Cas., Cardinal-Deacon
 Consistory of 1131 
 Mr. Donato, Cardinal-Priest
 Mr. Anselmo, Cardinal-Priest
 Mr. Rainaldo, Cardinal-Deacon
 Mr. Matteo, Cardinal-Deacon
 Consistory of 1135.03.31 : only Fr. Benedetto, O.S.B. Cas., Cardinal-Priest

 Antipope Nicholas V (1328–1330) - 4 consistories, 9 pseudocardinals
 Consistory of 1328.05.15 
 Giacomo Alberti, Bishop emeritus of Castello, Cardinal-Bishop
 Bishop Franz Hermann, Cardinal-Bishop
 Bonifazio Donoratico, O.P., Bishop of Chersonissos, Cardinal-Bishop
 Bishop Nicola Fabriani, O.E.S.A., Cardinal-Priest
 Father Pietro Oringa, Cardinal-Priest
 Fr. Giovanni Arlotti, Cardinal-Deacon
 Consistory of 1328.09 : only Fr. Paolo da Viterbo, O.F.M., Cardinal-Deacon
 Consistory of 1329.01.19 : only Fr. Giovanni Visconti (38), Cardinal-Deacon
 Consistory of 1329 : only Pandolfo Capocci, Cardinal-Deacon

 Antipope Felix V (1439–1449) - 4 consistories, 23 pseudocardinals

In Avignon 
 Antipope Clement VII (1378–1394) - 12 consistories, 33 pseudocardinals
 Consistory of 1378.12.18 (6)
 Giacomo d’Itri, Patriarch of Constantinople and Metropolitan Archbishop of Otranto (Italy), Cardinal-Priest
 Niccolò Brancaccio (38), Metropolitan Archbishop of Cosenza (Italy), Cardinal-Priest
 Pierre Amiel de Sarcenas, O.S.B. Clun. (69), Metropolitan Archbishop of Embrun (France), Cardinal-Priest
 Pierre-Raymond de Barrière, C.R.S.A., Bishop of Autun (France), Cardinal-Priest
 Fr. Nicolas de Saint Saturnin, O.P., Master of the Sacred Palace of Prefecture of the Holy Apostolic Palaces, Cardinal-Priest
 Fr. Leonardo Rossi da Giffoni, O.F.M., Minister General emeritus of Order of Friars Minor (Franciscans), Cardinal-Priest
 Consistory of 1381.03.19 : only Gautier Gómez de Luna, Bishop of Palencia (Spain)
 Consistory of 1382.05.30 : only Fr. Tommaso Clausse, O.P., Cardinal-Priest
 Consistory of 1383.12.23 :
 Pierre de Cros, O.S.B. Clun., Metropolitan Archbishop of Arles (France) and Chamberlain of the Holy Roman Church of Reverend Apostolic Camera, Cardinal-Priest
 Faydit d’Aigrefeuille, O.S.B. Clun., Bishop of Avignon (France), Cardinal-Priest
 Aymery de Magnac, Bishop of Paris (France), Cardinal-Priest
 Fr. Jacques de Menthonay, Cardinal-Priest
 Fr. Amedeo di Saluzzo (22), Bishop of Valence (France), Cardinal-Deacon
 Pierre Aycelin de Montaigut, O.S.B. Clun. (63), Bishop of Laon (France), Cardinal-Priest
 Walter Wardlaw (66), Bishop of Glasgow (Scotland), Cardinal-Priest
 Jean de Neufchatel (43), Bishop of Toul (France), Cardinal-Priest
 Fr. Pierre de Fetigny, Cardinal-Deacon
 Consistory of 1384.04.15 : only Fr. Pierre de Luxembourg (14), Bishop of Metz (France), Cardinal-Deacon
 Consistory of 1385.07.12 : 
 Bertrand de Chanac, Patriarch of Jerusalem and Apostolic Administrator of Le Puy-en-Velay (France), Cardinal-Priest
 Fr. Tommaso Ammannati, Metropolitan Archbishop of Napoli (Italy), Cardinal-Priest
 Giovanni Piacentini, Metropolitan Archbishop emeritus of Patrasso and Apostolic Administrator emeritus of Castello, Cardinal-Priest
 Amaury de Lautrec, Bishop of Saint-Bertrand-de-Comminges (France), Cardinal-Priest
 Jean de Murol (45), Bishop of Genève (Switzerland), Cardinal-Priest
 Jean Rolland, Bishop of Amiens (France), Cardinal-Priest
 Jean Allarmet de Brogny (43), Bishop of Viviers (France), Cardinal-Priest
 Pierre de Thury, Bishop of Maillezais, Cardinal-Priest
 Consistory of 1387.01 : only Jerónimo de Aragón (45), Bishop of Valencia (Spain), Cardinal-Priest
 Consistory of 1389.11.03 : only Jean de Talaru, Metropolitan Archbishop of Lyon (France), Cardinal-Priest
 Consistory of 1390.07.21 : only Martin de Zalba (53), Bishop of Pamplona (Spain), Cardinal-Priest
 Consistory of 1390.10.17 (2)
 Jean Flandrin (89), Metropolitan Archbishop of Auch (France), Cardinal-Priest
 Pierre Girard, Bishop of Le Puy-en-Velay (France), Cardinal-Priest
 Consistory of 1391.04.17 : only Guillaume de Vergy (41), Metropolitan Archbishop of Besançon (France), Cardinal-Priest
 Consistory of 1394.01.23 : only Pedro Fernández de Frías, Bishop of Osma (Spain), Cardinal-Priest

 Antipope Benedict XIII (1394–1423) - 7 consistories, 19 pseudocardinals
 Consistory of 1395.12.24 : only Mr. Pierre Blain, Cardinal-Deacon
 Consistory of 1397.09.22 
 Fernando Pérez Calvillo, Bishop of Tarazona (Spain), Cardinal-Priest
 Mr. Jofré de Boil, Cardinal-Deacon
 Pedro Serra, Bishop of Catania (Italy), Cardinal-Priest
 Consistory of 1397.12.21 
 Berenguer de Anglesola, Bishop of Gerona (Spain), Cardinal-Priest
 Mr. Bonifacio Ammannati, Cardinal-Deacon
 Louis de Bar (27), Bishop-elect of Langres (France), Cardinal-Deacon
 Consistory of 1404.05.09 
 Mr. Miguel de Zalba (30), Cardinal-Deacon
 Mr. Antonio de Challant (54), Cardinal-Deacon
 Consistory of 1408.09.22 
 Pierre Ravat, Canons Regular of Saint Augustine (C.R.S.A.), Bishop of Saint-Pons-de-Thomières (France), Cardinal-Priest
 Jean d’Armagnac (58), Metropolitan Archbishop emeritus of Auch (France), Cardinal-Priest
 Friar Juan Martínez de Murillo, Cistercian Order (O. Cist.), Cardinal-Priest
 Fr. Carlos Jordán de Urriés y Pérez Salanova, Cardinal-Deacon
 Mr. Alfonso Carrillo de Albornoz, Cardinal-Deacon
 Consistory of 1412.12.14 : only Mr. Pedro Fonseca, Cardinal-Deacon
 Consistory of 1423.05.22 
 Fr. Julián Lobera y Valtierra, Cardinal-Priest
 Mr. Ximeno Dahe, Cardinal-Priest
 Fr. Domingo de Bonnefoi, Carthusians (O. Cart.), Cardinal-Priest
 Bishop Jean Carrier, Cardinal-Priest

In Pisa 
 Antipope John XXIII (1410–1415) - 4 consistories, 18 pseudocardinals
 Consistory of 1411.06.06 
 Francesco Lando, Latin Patriarch of Constantinople and Latin Patriarch emeritus of Grado (Italy), Cardinal-Priest
 Antonio Panciera (61), Latin Patriarch of Aquileia (Italy), Cardinal-Priest
 Alamanno Adimari (49), Metropolitan Archbishop of Pisa (Italy), Cardinal-Priest
 João Afonso Esteves da Azambuja (71), Metropolitan Archbishop of Lisboa (Portugal), Cardinal-Priest
 Pierre d’Ailly (61), Bishop of Cambrai (France), Cardinal-Priest
  Georg von Liechtenstein-Nicolsburg (51), Bishop of Trento (Italy), declined is uncanonical promotion
 Tommaso Brancaccio, Bishop of Tricarico (Italy), Cardinal-Priest
 Branda Castiglione (61), Bishop emeritus of Piacenza (Italy), Cardinal-Priest
 Archbishop Thomas Langley (48), Bishop of Durham (England), Cardinal-Priest
 Archbishop Robert Hallam, Bishop of Salisbury (England), Cardinal-Priest
 Gilles Deschamps (61), Bishop of Coutances (France), Cardinal-Priest
 Guglielmo Carbone, Bishop of Chieti (Italy), Cardinal-Priest
 Father Guillaume Fillastre (63), Cardinal-Priest
 Msgr. Lucido Conti, Cardinal-Deacon
 Francesco Zabarella (50), Bishop of Firenze (Italy), Cardinal-Deacon
 Consistory of 1413.04.13 : only Simon de Cramaud (68), Latin Patriarch of Alexandria, Metropolitan Archbishop of Reims (France) and Apostolic Administrator of Avignon (France), Cardinal-Priest
 Consistory of 1413.11.18 : only Fr. Giacomo Isolani (53), Cardinal-Deacon
 Consistory of 1414.09 : only Pierre de Foix, O.F.M. (28), Bishop of Lescar (France), Cardinal-Priest

Sources and external links 
 GCatholic - Creations of (pseudo)cardinals by (Anti-)Pope
 under Anacletus II (Rome)
 under Benedict XIII (Avignon)
 under Clement VII (Avignon)
 under John XXIII (Pisa)
 under Nicholas V (Rome)
 Catalog of Pseudocardinals (1058-1447)

Western Schism